The 2019 PFF National Challenge Cup  was the 28th edition of domestic association football cup competition in Pakistan. 15 teams participated in the competition, commencing from 19 July and concluding on 4 August 2019. The competition was held in Peshawar, with Tehmas Khan Football Stadium and Qayyum Football Stadium hosting all the matches.

Teams
The following 15 teams participated in the tournament:

 Khan Research Laboratories (PPL)
 Pakistan Airforce (TH)
 PFF Tigers
 Asia Ghee Mills
 Civil Aviation Authority
 Karachi Port Trust
 Karachi United
 National Bank
 Pakistan Army
 Pakistan Navy
 Pakistan Police
 Pakistan Railways
 Pakistan Television
 Sui Southern Gas
 WAPDA

NotesTH = Challenge Cup title holders; PPL = Pakistan Premier League winners

Group stage

Group A

Group B

Group C

Group D

Knockout round

Quarter-finals

Semi-finals

Third place

Final

Details

Bracket

Statistics

Top goalscorers 
''

Clean Sheets

Awards

References

External links
 Pakistan Football Federation

Pakistan
2019 in Khyber Pakhtunkhwa 
National Challenge Cup
2010s in Peshawar
August 2019 sports events in Pakistan
Football competitions in Pakistan
July 2019 sports events in Pakistan
2019
Sport in Peshawar